Hello Mom! is the debut studio album by German electronic music duo Modeselektor. It was released on BPitch Control on 11 October 2005.

Critical reception

Nitsuh Abebe of Pitchfork gave the album an 8.3 out of 10, saying, "There's hardly a minute on this record that doesn't keep turning out to be way more fun than the last time you heard it." Tim O'Neil of PopMatters gave the album a 6 out of 10, commenting that "Hello Mom! is, like the very best albums, gleefully diverse and yet strangely focused." He added, "There are as many different flavors of techno as you can imagine here, but it all comes from the same impulse, a puckish desire to leave no stone unturned in their indefatigable quest to destroy the very notion of a techno orthodoxy."

Track listing

Personnel
Credits adapted from liner notes.

 Gernot Bronsert – production
 Sebastian Szary – production
 Cuizinier – vocals (1)
 Tido Berman – vocals (1)
 Teki Latex – vocals (1)
 DJ Orgasmic – turntables (1)
 Paul St. Hilaire – vocals (9)
 Matt Shadetek – additional production (11, 12)
 Sasha Perera – vocals (12)

References

External links
 

2005 debut albums
Modeselektor albums
BPitch Control albums